Reid Gettys (born 1963) is an American lawyer and a former college and professional basketball player, best known as a member of the Houston Cougars men's basketball team during the early 1980s.

Biography

Gettys played high school basketball at Houston's Memorial High School, but chose to stay home to attend college and play for Guy V. Lewis, rather than following in his father footsteps in attending and playing for Texas Tech University.

A "set up man" in large part, Gettys played a pivotal role in the success of the powerhouse Phi Slama Jama basketball teams at the University of Houston during the early to mid-1980s. Gettys, who ranks as Houston's all-time leader in assists with 740, was responsible for distributing the ball to teammates Hakeem Olajuwon, Clyde Drexler, Benny Anders, Michael Young, Larry Micheaux and, later, Ricky Winslow.  Gettys had a 17-assist game against Rice University on February 17, 1985.  He also handed out 15 assists in a November 26, 1983, game against the University of Kansas. He was also an accurate shooter from long distance (although he played prior to the three-point line) and virtually "automatic" from the free throw line.  During the 1982 NCAA Tournament, on March 21, 1982, Gettys sunk 10 consecutive free throws down the stretch to move Houston past Boston College and into the Final Four.

The  Gettys was drafted by the Chicago Bulls in the fifth round of the 1985 NBA draft, but never played in the NBA. He was a member of Bill Musselman's 1987–88 Albany Patroons team of the Continental Basketball Association (CBA) that posted a  record on its way to winning the CBA championship.

Gettys spent one season as an assistant coach for the Houston Cougars under his former teammate, Drexler. He has also worked as an ESPN basketball analyst and has been a commentator for Houston Rockets games.

Gettys later earned a J.D. degree and has worked as an attorney in Texas.  He and his wife, Lisa, have two sons and a daughter.

University of Houston Cougars records
Most assists, career: 740 (in 120 games) (14 in 1981–82; 209 in 1982–83; 309 in 1983–84; 208 in 1984–85)
Highest average, assists per game, career: 6.2 (740/120)
Most assists, season: 309 (in 37 games; 1983–84)
Highest average, assists per game, season: 8.4 (309/37, 1983–84)
Most assists, game: 17, vs. Rice, February 17, 1985

References

Living people
Albany Patroons players
Basketball players from Houston
Chicago Bulls draft picks
College basketball announcers in the United States
Houston Cougars men's basketball players
Houston Cougars men's basketball coaches
Point guards
Texas lawyers
1963 births
American men's basketball players